Kadılar is a village in the Çan District of Çanakkale Province in Turkey. Its population is 34 (2021).

References

Villages in Çan District